The reticulated python (Broghammerus reticulatus) is a python species native to South and Southeast Asia. It is the world's longest snake, and is among the three heaviest. It is listed as least concern on the IUCN Red List because of its wide distribution. In several countries in its range, it is hunted for its skin, for use in traditional medicine, and for sale as pets.

It is an excellent swimmer, has been reported far out at sea, and has colonized many small islands within its range.

Like all pythons, it is a non-venomous constrictor. Adult humans have been killed (and in at least two reported cases, eaten) by reticulated pythons.

Taxonomy
The reticulated python was first described in 1801 by German naturalist Johann Gottlob Theaenus Schneider, who described two zoological specimens held by the Göttingen Museum in 1801 that differed slightly in colour and pattern as separate species—Boa reticulata and Boa rhombeata. The specific name, reticulatus, is Latin meaning "net-like", or reticulated, and is a reference to the complex color pattern. The generic name Python was proposed by French naturalist François Marie Daudin in 1803. American zoologist Arnold G. Kluge performed a cladistics analysis on morphological characters and recovered the reticulated python lineage as sister to the genus Python, hence not requiring a new generic name in 1993.

In a 2004 genetics study using cytochrome b DNA, Robin Lawson and colleagues discovered the reticulated python as sister to Australo-Papuan pythons, rather than Python molurus and relatives. Raymond Hoser erected the genus Broghammerus for the reticulated python in 2004, naming it after German snake expert Stefan Broghammer, on the basis of dorsal patterns distinct from those of the genus Python, and a dark mid-dorsal line from the rear to the front of the head, and red or orange (rather than brown) iris colour. In 2008, Lesley H. Rawlings and colleagues reanalysed Kluge's morphological data and combined it with genetic material, and found the reticulated clade to be an offshoot of the Australo-Papuan lineage as well. They adopted and redefined the genus name Broghammerus.

However, this and numerous other names by the same author were criticized by several authors, who proposed ignoring them for the purposes of nomenclature despite this being contrary to the ICZN Code that underpins binomial nomenclature, ostensibly promoting the establishment of a dual nomenclature. R. Graham Reynolds and colleagues subsequently and knowing that it was described already, redescribed the genus Malayopython for this species and its sister species, the Timor python, calling the Timor python M. timoriensis. Hoser has since correctly pointed out that the Malayopython name is a junior synonym of Broghammerus, thus it should not be recognized and the International Code of Zoological Nomenclature has made a ruling that supports this contention by Hoser. Neither of these proposed reclassifications has been recognized by the ITIS, but Malayopython has been recognized by a number of subsequent authors and the Reptile Database.

Subspecies
Three subspecies have been proposed:
 M. r. reticulatus (Schneider, 1801) – Asiatic reticulated python
 M. r. jampeanus Auliya et al., 2002 – Kayaudi reticulated python or Tanahjampean reticulated python, about half the length, or according to Auliya et al. Found on Tanahjampea in the Selayar Archipelago south of Sulawesi. Closely related to M. r. reticulatus of the Lesser Sundas.
 M. r. saputrai Auliya et al., 2002 – Selayer reticulated python, occurs on Selayar Island in the Selayar Archipelago and also in adjacent Sulawesi. This subspecies represents a sister lineage to all other populations of reticulated pythons tested. According to Auliya et al. (2002) it does not exceed  in length.

The latter two are dwarf subspecies. Apparently, the population of the Sangihe Islands north of Sulawesi represents another such subspecies, which is basal to the P. r. reticulatus plus P. r. jampeanus clade, but it is not yet formally described.

The proposed subspecies M. r. "dalegibbonsi", M. r. "euanedwardsi", M. r. "haydnmacphiei", M. r. "neilsonnemani", M. r. "patrickcouperi", and M. r. "stuartbigmorei" have not found general acceptance.

Characteristics

The reticulated python has smooth dorsal scales that are arranged in 69–79 rows at midbody. Deep pits occur on four anterior upper labials, on two or three anterior lower labials, and on five or six posterior lower labials.

The reticulated python is the largest snake native to Asia.

When Colossus died on 14 April 1963, its body was deposited in the Carnegie Museum of Natural History. At that time, its skeleton was measured and found to be  in total length, and the length of its fresh hide was measured as  – both measurements being significantly shorter than what had been previously estimated in 1956. The hide tends to stretch from the skinning process, thus may be longer than the snake from which it came – e.g., by roughly 20–40% or more. The previous reports had been constructed by combining partial measurements with estimations to compensate for "kinks", since completely straightening an extremely large live python is virtually impossible. Because of these issues, a 2012 journal article concluded, "Colossus was neither the longest snake nor the heaviest snake ever maintained in captivity." Too large to be preserved with formaldehyde and then stored in alcohol, the specimen was instead prepared as a disarticulated skeleton. The hide was sent to a laboratory to be tanned, but it was either lost or destroyed, and now only the skull and selected vertebrae and ribs remain in the museum's collection. Considerable confusion exists in the literature over whether Colossus was male or female (females tend to be larger).
Numerous reports have been made of larger snakes, but since none of these was measured by a scientist nor any of the specimens deposited at a museum, they must be regarded as unproven and possibly erroneous. In spite of what has been, for many years, a standing offer of a large financial reward (initially $1,000, later raised to $5,000, then $15,000 in 1978 and $50,000 in 1980) for a live, healthy snake  or longer by the New York Zoological Society (later renamed as the Wildlife Conservation Society), no attempt to claim this reward has ever been made.

Reported sizes 

The colour pattern is a complex geometric pattern that incorporates different colours. The back typically has a series of irregular diamond shapes flanked by smaller markings with light centers. In this species' wide geographic range, much variation of size, colour, and markings commonly occurs.

In zoo exhibits, the colour pattern may seem garish, but in a shadowy jungle environment amid fallen leaves and debris, it allows them to virtually disappear. Called disruptive colouration, it protects them from predators and helps them to catch their prey.

The huge size and attractive pattern of this snake has made it a favorite zoo exhibit, with several individuals claimed to be above  in length and more than one claimed to be the largest in captivity. However, due to its huge size, immense strength, aggressive disposition, and the mobility of the skin relative to the body, it is very difficult to get exact length measurements of a living reticulated python, and weights are rarely indicative, as captive pythons are often obese. For this reason, scientists do not accept the validity of length measurements unless performed on a dead or anesthetized snake that is later preserved in a museum collection or stored for scientific research.

A reticulated python kept in the United States in Kansas City, Missouri, named "Medusa" is considered by the Guinness Book of World Records to be the longest living snake ever kept in captivity. In 2011 it was reported to measure  and weigh .

In 2012, an albino reticulated python, named "Twinkie", housed in Fountain Valley, California, was considered to be the largest albino snake in captivity by the Guinness World Records.

Dwarf forms of reticulated pythons also occur, from some islands northwest of Australia, and these are being selectively bred in captivity to be much smaller, resulting in animals often referred to as "super dwarfs".

Distribution and habitat

The reticulated python is found in South and Southeast Asia from the Nicobar Islands, India, Bangladesh, Myanmar, Thailand, Laos, Cambodia, Vietnam, Malaysia, and Singapore, east through Indonesia and the Indo-Australian Archipelago (Sumatra, the Mentawai Islands, the Natuna Islands, Borneo, Sulawesi, Java, Lombok, Sumbawa, Sumba, Flores, Timor, Maluku, Tanimbar Islands) and the Philippines (Basilan, Bohol, Cebu, Leyte, Luzon, Mindanao, Mindoro, Negros, Palawan, Panay, Polillo, Samar, Tawi-Tawi). The original description does not include a type locality. The type locality was restricted to "Java" by Brongersma (1972).

Three subspecies have been proposed, but are not recognized in the Integrated Taxonomic Information System. The color and size can vary a great deal among the subspecies described. Geographical location is a good key to establishing the subspecies, as each one has a distinct geographical range.

The reticulated python lives in rainforests, woodlands, and nearby grasslands. It is also associated with rivers and is found in areas with nearby streams and lakes. An excellent swimmer, it has even been reported far out at sea and has consequently colonized many small islands within its range. During the early years of the 20th century, it is said to have been common even in busy parts of Bangkok, sometimes eating domestic animals.

Behaviour and ecology

Diet

As with all pythons, the reticulated python is an ambush predator, usually waiting until prey wanders within strike range before seizing it in its coils and killing by constriction. Its natural diet includes mammals and occasionally birds. As a rule, the reticulated python seems able to swallow prey up to one-quarter its own length and up to its own weight. Near human habitation, it is known to snatch stray chickens, cats, and dogs on occasion.
Among the largest documented prey items are a half-starved sun bear of  that was eaten by a  specimen and took some 10 weeks to digest.
At least one case is reported of a foraging python entering a forest hut and taking a child.

Reproduction
The reticulated python is oviparous. Adult females lay between 15 and 80 eggs per clutch. Hatchlings are at least  in length. Reticulated pythons have been observed shivering to increase the ambient temperature around them. This is used exclusively by female Reticulated Pythons during the incubation of eggs.

Danger to humans

The reticulated python is among the few snakes that prey on humans. On April 9, 2015, the species was added to the Lacey Act list in the United States, prohibiting import and interstate transport due to its "injurious" history with humans. Attacks on humans are not common, but this species has been responsible for several reported human fatalities, in both the wild and captivity. Considering the known maximum prey size, a full-grown reticulated python can open its jaws wide enough to swallow a human, but the width of the shoulders of some adult Homo sapiens can pose a problem for even a snake with sufficient size. Reports of human fatalities and human consumption (the latest examples of consumption of an adult human being well authenticated) include:

 A report of a visit of Antonio van Diemen, Governor-General of the Dutch East India Company, to the Banda Islands in 1638, includes a description of an enslaved woman who, when tending to a garden on the volcanic island of Gunung Api, was strangled by a snake of "24 houtvoeten" (slightly over seven meters) in length, and then swallowed whole. The snake, having become slow after ingesting such a large prey, was subsequently shot by Dutch soldiers and brought to the Governor-General to be looked at, with its victim still inside. Although the species was not named, the only snake found in Banda matching this description is the reticulated python.
 In early 20th-century Indonesia: On Salibabu island, North Sulawesi, a 14-year-old boy was killed and supposedly eaten by a specimen  in length. Another incident involved a woman reputedly eaten by a "large reticulated python", but few details are known.
 In the early 1910s or in 1927, a jeweller went hunting with his friends and was apparently eaten by a  python after he sought shelter from a rainstorm in or under a tree. Supposedly, he was swallowed feet-first, perhaps the easiest way for a snake to actually swallow a human.
 In 1932, Frank Buck wrote about a teenaged boy who was eaten by a pet  reticulated python in the Philippines. According to Buck, the python escaped, and when it was found, a human child's shape was recognized inside the snake, and turned out to be the son of the snake's owner.
 Among a small group of Aeta negritos in the Philippines, six deaths by pythons were said to have been documented within a period of 40 years, plus one who died later of an infected bite.
 In September 1995, a 29-year-old rubber tapper from the southern Malaysian state of Johor was reported to have been killed by a large reticulated python. The victim had apparently been caught unaware and was squeezed to death. The snake had coiled around the lifeless body with the victim's head gripped in its jaws when it was stumbled upon by the victim's brother.
 In October 2008, a 25-year-old woman appeared to have been killed by a  pet reticulated python. The apparent cause of death was asphyxiation. The snake was later found in the bedroom in an agitated state.
 In January 2009, a 3-year-old boy was wrapped in the coils of a  pet reticulated python, turning blue. The boy's mother, who had been petsitting the python on behalf of a friend, rescued the toddler by gashing the python with a knife. The snake was later euthanized because of its wounds.
 In December 2013, a 59-year-old security guard was strangled to death while trying to capture a python near the Bali Hyatt, a luxury hotel on Indonesia's resort island. The incident happened around 3 am as the 4.5-m (15-ft) python was crossing a road near the hotel. The victim had offered to help capture the snake, which had been spotted several times before near the hotel in the Sanur, Bali, area and escaped back into nearby bushes.
In March 2017, the body of Akbar Salubiro, a 25-year-old farmer in Central Mamuju Regency, West Sulawesi, Indonesia, was found inside the stomach of a  reticulated python. He had been declared missing from his palm tree plantation, and the people searching for him found the python the next day with a large bulge in its stomach. They killed the python and found the whole body of the missing farmer inside. This was the first fully confirmed case of a person being eaten by a python. The process of retrieving the body from the python's stomach was documented by pictures and videos taken by witnesses.
 In June 2018, a 54-year-old Indonesian woman in Muna Island, Southeast Sulawesi, Indonesia, was killed and eaten by a  python. The woman went missing one night while working in her garden, and the next day, a search party was organized after some of her belongings were found abandoned in the garden. The python was found near the garden with a large bulge in its body. The snake was killed and carried into town, where it was cut open, revealing the woman's body completely intact.
The incident took place near a waterfall at Mount Kahar in Rumbia sub-district. The victim was separated from his four friends in the woods. When he screamed, his friends came to help and found him encoiled by a large python. Villagers came to help and managed to kill the snake using a parang machete. However, the victim had already suffocated.
In October 2022, a 52-year-old woman in Terjun Gajah village, Betara Subdistrict, West Tanjung Jabung Regency, Jambi, Indonesia, was killed and swallowed whole by a  reticulated python. She went to tap rubber sap on 23 October 2022 and did not return home after sunset. After she was reported missing for a day and a night,  a search party discovered a large python with a bulge in its body in a jungle near the rubber plantation. The villagers immediately killed and dissected the python and discovered the intact body of the missing woman inside. Villagers were alarmed, fearing more large pythons might be lurking in the rubber plantation, because farmers previously had reported two goats missing.

In captivity

Increased popularity of the reticulated python in the pet trade is due largely to increased efforts in captive breeding and selectively bred mutations such as the "albino" and "tiger" strains. It can make a good captive, but keepers should have previous experience with large constrictors to ensure safety to both animal and keeper. Although its interactivity and beauty draws much attention, some feel it is unpredictable. It does not attack humans by nature, but will bite and possibly constrict if it feels threatened, or mistakes a hand for food. While not venomous, large pythons can inflict serious injuries by biting, sometimes requiring stitches.

In popular culture
In Moonraker (1979), a reticulated python tries to suffocate James Bond (Roger Moore), but Bond kills the snake with a hypodermic pen.

See also
List of largest snakes
Burmese python

References

Further reading

Auliya, M.A. (2003). Taxonomy, Life History and Conservation of Giant Reptiles in West Kalimantan. Ph.D. thesis, University of Bonn.
 (HTML abstract, electronic supplement available to subscribers).

External links

 Reticulated python life history at Reticulatedpython.info . Accessed 7 November 2009
 Python reticulatus at ReptileExpert.org. Accessed 22 August 2011.
 Reticulated python at Answers.com. Accessed 12 September 2007.
 Study of man-eating snakes: Snakes are predators on, prey of, and competitors with primates Cornell Chronicle Online. Accessed 22 December 2011.
 25 ft World's Longest Snake
 Python swallows Indonesian man whole Fox News

Apex predators
Reptiles of Borneo
Fauna of the Lesser Sunda Islands
Reptiles described in 1801
Reptiles of Bangladesh
Reptiles of Brunei
Reptiles of Cambodia
Reptiles of India
Reptiles of Indonesia
Reptiles of Laos
Reptiles of Malaysia
Reptiles of Myanmar
Reptiles of Singapore
Reptiles of Thailand
Reptiles of the Philippines
Reptiles of Vietnam
Snakes of Southeast Asia
Snakes of Vietnam
Reptiles as pets
Taxa named by Johann Gottlob Theaenus Schneider